The United States Senate election of 1972 in Massachusetts was held on November 7, 1972.  Incumbent Republican Senator Edward Brooke defeated Democratic nominee John Droney in a landslide. , this remains the last time that a Republican has Massachusetts’s Class 2 Senate seat and the last time a Republican has been elected to either Senate seat for a full term. This was also the last time until 2010 that a Republican would win any U.S. Senate election in the state.

Republican primary

Candidates
 Edward Brooke, incumbent Senator since 1967

Senator Edward Brooke was unopposed for re-nomination. At the state convention on June 24, he was renominated by acclamation.

Democratic primary

Candidates
 John J. Droney, Middlesex County District Attorney
 Gerald O'Leary, Boston City Councilor
 John P. Lynch, Hampden County Register of Deeds

Declined
 John Kenneth Galbraith, economist and former U.S. Ambassador to India

Campaign
John Droney won the party endorsement at the June 11 convention on the sixth ballot. The party platform endorsed legalized marijuana and an end to the Vietnam War.

During the campaign, Droney declined to prosecute Senator Brooke for perjury stemming admitted misstatements during his divorce proceedings, citing a lack of jurisdiction as the proceedings had taken place in Boston.

Results

General election

Candidates
 Edward Brooke, incumbent Senator since 1967 (Republican)
 John J. Droney, Middlesex County District Attorney (Democratic)
 Donald Gurewitz, anti-war activist (Socialist Workers)

Results

See also
 United States Senate elections, 1972

External links and references
 Race details at ourcampaigns.com

1972
United States Senate
Massachusetts